Sand Cay , also known as Bailan Island; Son Ca Island;  Mandarin , is a cay on the north edge of the Tizard Bank of the Spratly Islands in the South China Sea. The island has been occupied by Vietnam since 1974, (first by South Vietnam, then by the Socialist Republic of Vietnam after 1975). It is also claimed by China (PRC), the Philippines, Vietnam, and Taiwan (ROC).

Sovereignty
The island has been occupied by Vietnam since 1974, (first by South Vietnam, then by the Socialist Republic of Vietnam after 1975). However, no Vietnamese stations have been built. By the later half of the 20th century, no nation had complete sovereignty on the islands.

Geography
Sand Cay is commonly confused with Sandy Cay which is a sandy shoal (coral reef) near Thitu Island.

Ecology
Sand Cay has no source of natural fresh water, but the islet's coral sand is covered with a thin layer of fertile humus mixing with guano. The vegetation mainly composes of Barringtonia asiatica, Ipomoea pes-caprae and Casuarinaceae's species as well as some kinds of grass. In recent years, islanders have cultivated fruit trees such as pomelo, jackfruit, dragonfruit, sugar-apple and guava. Sand Cay is usually visited by seabirds, and its surrounding water is rich with fish, sea snails and sea cucumbers.

See also
 Great wall of sand
 List of maritime features in the Spratly Islands
 Spratly Islands dispute
 Truong Sa District

References

External links
Maritime Transparency Initiative Island Tracker

Islands of the Spratly Islands
Tizard Bank